WJGR-LP (97.1 FM) is a radio station licensed to the University of South Alabama in Mobile, Alabama.  The station is student-run and airs a college radio format.

References

External links

JGR
JGR
JGR
University of South Alabama